is a passenger railway station located in the city of Akō, Hyōgo Prefecture, Japan, operated by the West Japan Railway Company (JR West).

Lines

Station layout
The station consists of two opposed ground-level side platforms connected by an elevated station building. The station is staffed.

Platforms

Adjacent stations

|-
!colspan=5|JR West

History
Une Station was opened on 10 July 1890. With the privatization of Japanese National Railways (JNR) on 1 April 1987, the station came under the control of JR West.

Passenger statistics
In fiscal 2019, the station was used by an average of 246 passengers daily

Surrounding area
Unehara / Tanaka Archaeological Park
Japan National Route 2

See also
List of railway stations in Japan

References

External links

 JR West Station Official Site

Railway stations in Hyōgo Prefecture
Sanyō Main Line
Railway stations in Japan opened in 1890
Akō, Hyōgo